United Nations Security Council resolution 1557, adopted unanimously on 12 August 2004, after reaffirming previous resolutions on Iraq, particularly resolutions 1500 (2003) and 1546 (2004), the Council extended the mandate of the United Nations Assistance Mission in Iraq (UNAMI) for a further period of twelve months. The resolution was drafted by the United Kingdom and United States.

The Security Council reaffirmed the sovereignty and territorial integrity of Iraq, and the role of the United Nations in the country. It welcomed the appointment of a Special Representative of the Secretary-General Ashraf Qazi, by the Secretary-General Kofi Annan. Extending UNAMI's mandate for an additional twelve months, the Council declared its intention to review its mandate if requested to do so by the Iraqi government.

See also
 Iraq War
 List of United Nations Security Council Resolutions 1501 to 1600 (2003–2005)

References

External links
 
Text of the Resolution at undocs.org

 1557
2004 in Iraq
 1557
August 2004 events